South Korea, as Korea, competed at the 1952 Summer Olympics in Helsinki, Finland.

Medalists

Results and competitors by event

Athletics

Track and road

Field

Boxing

Cycling

Road Competition

Equestrian

Weightlifting

Wrestling
Men's Freestyle

References
Official Olympic Reports
International Olympic Committee results database

Korea, South
1952
1952 in South Korean sport